Witterda is a municipality in the Sömmerda district of Thuringia, Germany.

References

Sömmerda (district)